Barret House may refer to:

Barret House (Henderson, Kentucky), listed on the National Register of Historic Places in Henderson County, Kentucky
Barret-Keach Farm, Henderson, Kentucky, listed on the National Register of Historic Places in Henderson County, Kentucky
Tol Barret House, Nacogdoches, Texas, listed on the National Register of Historic Places in Nacogdoches County, Texas
Barret House (Richmond, Virginia), listed on the National Register of Historic Places in Richmond, Virginia

See also
Barrett House (disambiguation)